Launch Complex 6 (LC-6) at Cape Canaveral Space Force Station, Florida is a launch site used by Redstone and Jupiter series rockets and missiles. It is on the south end of Cape Canaveral, close to Launch Complex 5, with which it shared a blockhouse. With LC-5, it was the location of the first tests of the mobile launch concept designed by Kurt H. Debus. This concept was revised and improved and eventually used at LC-39 for the Saturn V and Space Shuttle. 

LC-6 was deactivated in 1961. The blockhouse and a  square concrete pad are the only parts of the complex that remain intact, although the mobile service tower was under restoration as of 2011. The complex is part of the "Cape Canaveral: Then and Now" tour, available from the Kennedy Space Center Visitor Complex.

Gallery

See also
Cape Canaveral
Cape Canaveral Launch Complex 5 - used the same blockhouse

References
Space Launch Report, Cape Canaveral Launch Complexes 5/6/26A/26B

Cape Canaveral Space Force Station